Janusz Wiesław Kaleta (born October 11, 1964, in Łazy, Poland) was a Catholic bishop who was laicized in 2016.

Biography 

Born in 1964, Kaleta was ordained a priest in 1989 in the Diocese of Tarnów. Since 7 July 1999 he was the Apostolic Administrator of Atyrau, Kazakhstan. On September 15, 2006, he was elevated to the episcopate by Pope Benedict XVI, who appointed him titular bishop.

Kaleta worked pastorally in Nowy Wiśnicz and Bochnia. After studying theology in Innsbruck in 1997 obtained a doctorate in moral theology, and his work devoted to issues of bioethics. In 1999 he moved to pastoral work in Kazakhstan. On July 7, 1999, John Paul II created the country's Apostolic Administration of Atyrau, the first with their manager was appointed Father Kaleta. This church subdivision includes western regions of Kazakhstan bordering the Caspian Sea.

Consecrated on November 23, 2006, at St. Peter at the Vatican by Cardinal Secretary of State and retired dean of the College of Cardinals Angelo Sodano. Co-consecrating bishops were Bishop Wiktor Skworc and Bishop Henry Theophilus Howaniec, OFM. On February 5, 2011, Pope Benedict XVI appointed him bishop of Karaganda, while leaving him temporarily as an apostolic administrator of Atyrau.

He resigned as Bishop of Karaganda on July 15, 2014; at that time it was not clear whether this was due to his health problems, the management of the diocese or another reason. It was later known that monsignor Kaleta had a relationship with a woman and the couple had several embryos frozen. He was laicized June 15, 2016.

References

External links
 http://www.gcatholic.org/dioceses/diocese/kara2.htm
 http://www.radiovaticana.org/pol/articolo.asp?c=460061
 https://web.archive.org/web/20130406073810/http://www.catholic-kazakhstan.org/Atyrau/Pl/index.htm
 http://info.wiara.pl/doc/161430.Polak-biskupem-w-Kazachstanie

1964 births
Living people
Kazakhstani Roman Catholic bishops
Polish Roman Catholic priests
Catholic Diocese of Karaganda
Laicized Roman Catholic bishops